The Icelandic Society for the Protection of Birds (or the Fuglavernd) was established in 1963 and is the main amateur or non-governmental organisation in Iceland whose policy is the conservation of birds and their habitats and the spreading of knowledge of the same.

Björn Guðbrandsson
For many years Dr Björn Guðbrandsson (1917–2006) was the society's main driving force.

Early years
For its first 30 years it was principally concerned with saving the Icelandic white-tailed eagle population from extinction. And it was thanks to the efforts of the society that it did not become extinct in the 1960s.

Species for special attention
In more recent times in addition to the society has argued for banning the hunting of the rock ptarmigan and the Greenland white-fronted goose. These bans have been effected.

Habitat protection
The society has identified and campaigned for the conservation and protection of some important areas and has even helped establish a reserve east of the Ölfusá River, and north of Eyrarbakki, the Flói Nature Reserve (in cooperation with the Árborg community).

International connections
The Fuglavernd is the Icelandic designated partner of BirdLife International.

References

External links
Icelandic Society for the Protection of Birds

Further reading
 Johann Oli Hilmarsson (2000) Icelandic Bird Guide, IDUNN

Animal welfare organizations based in Europe
Bird conservation organizations
Ornithological organizations
.
Environmental organizations established in 1963
1963 establishments in Iceland